Rick Trotter is a former American public address announcer for the Memphis Grizzlies of the National Basketball Association. Trotter's employment was terminated by the Grizzlies on August 9, 2016 after an arrest warrant was issued.

Trotter replaced John Paul Stevenson after the 2005-06 NBA season as the voice of the Grizzlies at FedExForum .

Facts
 Graduate of Tri-Cities High School of Visual and Performing Arts.
 Trotter worked as a restaurant manager at Chick-fil-A. 
 Trotter idolized former Chicago Bulls public address announcer Ray Clay.

External links
 Article on Trotter's hiring from commercialappeal.com

Living people
American sports announcers
Memphis Grizzlies
National Basketball Association public address announcers
Year of birth missing (living people)